Suzanne Opton  (born 1945) is an American photographer. 

For her 2011 book Soldier, Many Wars she took portraits of American soldiers who had recently returned from war. In 2011 she was a fellow of the John Simon Guggenheim Memorial Foundation. Her work is included in the collections of the Smithsonian American Art Museum and the Brooklyn Museum.

References

1945 births
Artists from Portland, Oregon
20th-century American photographers
20th-century American women artists
21st-century American photographers
21st-century American women artists
American women photographers
Photographers from Oregon
Living people